Dryopomera ceylonica, is a species of false blister beetle found in Sri Lanka.

Description
Female is described as follows:

There is a sub-humeral stripe on elytra which is narrowly connected with supra-apical spot. Elytra pubescence is sparse and short. Abdomen yellowish. Lateral sides of the ventrum is black. Sutural margin of elytra slightly sinuate. Apical sternite slightly convex, whereas apex shallowly emarginate.

References 

Scarabaeinae
Insects of Sri Lanka
Insects described in 1994